Veldenz Castle was built on a spur above the village of Nohfelden in Landkreis Sankt Wendel in the northeast of Saarland, Germany.

History 
The hill castle is first mentioned in 1285, in a document stipulating that its builder, Count William Bossel II of Stein from Oberstein an der Nahe had to allow his liege lord, the Count of Veldenz to use the castle in case of war or a feud.

The Dukes of Palatinate-Zweibrücken acquired the Lordship of Nohfelden, including Veldenz Castle, in the middle of the 15th century.  The castle served in 1490 as the stage for one of the saddest chapters in the history of Palatinate-Zweibrücken: after the death of Duke Louis the Black, his sons Kaspar and Alexander ruled the duchy jointly for a year.  Then Alexander had his older brother locked up in the castle, claiming that Kaspar was mad.  Kaspar remained locked up in Veldenz castle until his death in 1527, even after Alexander's death.

The castle was frequently damaged in the many wars of the 17th century, but was repaired equally often.  In 1661, Duke Frederick of Zweibrücken-Veldenz died at the castle.

In 1804 the castle was nationalized by the French state, then sold off to the Cetto brothers from Sankt Wendel.  They used the castle as a source of building materials.

The municipality of Nohfelden is the current owner of the castle.

Grounds 
Most of the surrounding wall still stands. Houses have been built on the grounds.

The basement has been made accessible to the public in 1971.

The tower is accessible to the public from April to October. Guided tours can be arranged via the local tourist office.

References and sources 
 Conrad Flesch: Burgen und Schlösser an der Saar, Minerva Verlag, Saarbrücken, 1988. 

Ruined castles in Germany
Castles in Saarland
Buildings and structures in Sankt Wendel (district)